The Tupolev Tu-144 (NATO reporting name: Charger) is a Soviet supersonic passenger airliner designed by Tupolev in operation from 1968 to 1999.

The Tu-144 was the world's first commercial supersonic transport aircraft with its prototype's maiden flight from Zhukovsky Airport on 31 December 1968, two months before the British-French Concorde. The Tu-144 was a product of the Tupolev Design Bureau, an OKB headed by aeronautics pioneer Aleksey Tupolev, and 16 aircraft were manufactured by the Voronezh Aircraft Production Association in Voronezh. The Tu-144 first went supersonic on 5 June 1969, four months before Concorde, and on 26 May 1970 became the world's first commercial transport to exceed Mach 2.

Reliability and developmental issues, together with repercussions of the 1973 Paris Air Show Tu-144 crash and rising fuel prices, restricted the viability of the Tu-144 for regular use. The Tu-144 was introduced into passenger service with Aeroflot between Moscow and Alma-Ata on 1 November 1977, but withdrawn less than seven months later after another Tu-144 crash-landed on 23 May 1978. The Tu-144 remained in commercial service as a cargo aircraft until the cancellation of the Tu-144 program in 1983. The Tu-144 was later used by the Soviet space program to train pilots of the Buran spacecraft, and by NASA for supersonic research until 1999. The Tu-144 made its final flight on 26 June 1999 and surviving aircraft were put on display across the world or into storage.

Development

The Soviet government published the concept of the Tu-144 in an article in the January 1962 issue of the magazine Technology of Air Transport. The air ministry started development of the Tu-144 on 26 July 1963, 10 days after the design was approved by the Council of Ministers. The plan called for five flying prototypes to be built in four years, with the first aircraft to be ready in 1966.
The MiG-21I (1968; Izdeliye 21–11; "Analog") I = Imitator ("Simulator") was a testbed for the wing design of the Tu-144.

Despite the similarity in appearance of the Tu-144 to the Anglo-French supersonic aircraft (which earned it the nickname "Concordski"), there were significant differences between two aircraft. The Tu-144 is bigger and faster than the Concorde (M2.15 vs. M2.04). Concorde used an electronic engine control package from Lucas, which Tupolev was not permitted to purchase for the Tu-144 as it could also be used on military aircraft. Concorde's designers used fuel as coolant for the cabin air conditioning and for the hydraulic system (see Concorde for details). Tupolev also used fuel/hydraulic heat exchangers, but used cooling turbines for the cabin air.

The Tu-144 prototype was a full-scale demonstrator aircraft with the very different production aircraft being developed in parallel. While both Concorde and the Tu-144 prototype had ogival delta wings, the Tu-144's wing lacked Concorde's conical camber. Production Tu-144s replaced this wing with a double delta wing including spanwise and chordwise camber. They also added two small retractable surfaces called a moustache canard, with fixed double-slotted leading-edge slats and retractable double-slotted flaps. These were fitted just behind the cockpit and increased lift at low speeds.

Moving the elevons downward in a delta-wing aircraft increases the lift, but also pitches its nose downward. It is open to argument how stable the Tu-144S was at the listed airspeed. In any event, when NASA subcontracted Tupolev bureau in the 1990s to convert one of the remaining Tu-144D to a Tu-144LL standard, the procedure set by Tupolev for landing defined the Tu-144LL "final approach speed... on the order of 360 km/h depending on fuel weight." Brian Calvert, Concorde's technical flight manager and its first commercial pilot in command for several inaugural flights, cites final approach speed of a typical Concorde landing to be . The lower landing speed compared to Tu-144 is due to Concorde's more refined design of the wing profile that provides higher lift at low speeds without degrading supersonic cruise performance – a feature often mentioned in Western publications on Concorde and acknowledged by Tupolev designers as well.

Design

Along with early Tu-134s, the Tu-144 was one of the last commercial aircraft with a braking parachute. The Tu-144 was not fitted with any reverse thrust capabilities, and so the parachute was used as the sole alternative. The prototypes were also the only passenger jets ever fitted with ejection seats, albeit only for the crew and not the passengers.

Engines

SSTs for M2.2 had been designed in the Soviet Union before Tupolev was tasked with developing one. Design studies for the Myasishchev SST had shown that a cruise specific fuel consumption (SFC) of not more than 1.2 kg/kgp hr would be required. The only engine available in time with the required thrust and suitable for testing and perfecting the aircraft was the afterburning Kuznetsov NK-144 turbofan with a cruise SFC of 1.58 kg/kgp hr. Development of an alternative engine to meet the SFC requirement, a non-afterburning turbojet, the Kolesov RD-36-51A, began in 1964. It took a long time for this engine to achieve acceptable SFC and reliability. Afterburners were added to Concorde to meet its take-off thrust requirement and were not necessary for supersonic cruise; the Tu-144 used maximum afterburner for take-off and minimum for cruise.

The Tu-144S, of which nine were produced, was fitted with the Kuznetsov NK-144A turbofan to address lack of take-off thrust and surge margin. SFC at M2.0 was 1.81 kg/kgp hr. A further improvement, the NK-144V, achieved the required SFC, but too late to influence the decision to use the Kolesov RD-36-51.

The Tu-144D, of which five were produced (plus one uncompleted), was powered by the Kolesov RD-36-51 turbojet with an SFC of 1.22 kg/kgp hr. The range with full payload increased to 5,330 km compared to 6,470 km for Concorde. Plans for an aircraft with a range in excess of  range were never implemented.

The engine intakes had variable intake ramps and bypass flaps with positions controlled automatically to suit the engine airflow. They were very long to help prevent surging; twice as long as those on Concorde. Jean Rech (Sud Aviation) states the need for excessive length was based on the misconception that length was required to attenuate intake distortion. The intakes were to be shortened by 10 feet on the projected Tu-144M.

The Kolesov RD-36-51 had an unusual variable con-di nozzle for the nozzle pressure ratios at supersonic speeds. Without an afterburner there was no variable nozzle already available. A translating plug nozzle was used.

Production

Sixteen airworthy Tu-144 airplanes were built:
 the prototype Tu-144, registration number 68001
 a pre-production Tu-144, number 77101
 nine production Tu-144S, numbers 77102 to 77110
 five Tu-144D models, numbers 77111 to 77115.
Although its last commercial passenger flight was in 1978, production of the Tu-144 did not cease until 1983, when construction of the airframe was stopped and left partially complete. The last production aircraft, Tu-144D number 77116, was not completed and was left derelict for many years on Voronezh East airfield. There was at least one ground test airframe for static testing in parallel with the development of prototype 68001.

Operational history

Operational service

The Tu-144S went into service on 26 December 1975, flying mail and freight between Moscow and Alma-Ata in preparation for passenger services, which commenced on 1 November 1977. The type certificate was issued by the USSR Gosaviaregister on 29 October 1977.

The passenger service ran a semi-scheduled service until the first Tu-144D experienced an in-flight failure during a pre-delivery test flight, crash-landing on 23 May 1978 with two crew fatalities. The Tu-144's 55th and last scheduled passenger flight occurred on 1 June 1978.

An Aeroflot freight-only service recommenced using the new production variant Tu-144D ("D" for Dal'nyaya – "long range") aircraft on 23 June 1979, including longer routes from Moscow to Khabarovsk made possible by the more efficient Kolesov RD-36-51 turbojet engines, which also increased the maximum cruising speed to Mach 2.15.

There were only 103 scheduled flights before the Tu-144 was removed from commercial service.

Later use

The Tu-144 programme was cancelled by a Soviet government decree on 1 July 1983 that also provided for future use of the remaining Tu-144 aircraft as airborne laboratories. In 1985, Tu-144D were used to train pilots for the Soviet Buran space shuttle. In 1986–1988 Tu-144D No. 77114, built in 1981, was used for medical and biological research of high-altitude atmosphere radiological conditions. Further research was planned but not completed, due to lack of funding.

Use by NASA
In the early 1990s, a wealthy businesswoman, Judith DePaul, and her company IBP Aerospace negotiated an agreement with Tupolev, NASA, Rockwell and later Boeing. They offered a Tu-144 as a testbed for NASA's High Speed Commercial Research program, which was intended to design a second-generation supersonic jetliner called the High Speed Civil Transport. In 1995, Tu-144D No. 77114 (with only 82.5 hours of flight time) was taken out of storage and after extensive modification at a cost of US$350million, designated the Tu-144LL (where LL is a Russian abbreviation for Flying Laboratory, Letayushchaya Laboratoriya). The aircraft made 27 flights in Russia during 1996 and 1997. Though regarded as a technical success, the project was cancelled for lack of funding in 1999.

This aircraft was reportedly sold in June 2001 for $11M via an on-line auction, but the aircraft sale did not proceed. Tejavia Systems, the company handling the transaction, reported in September 2003 that the deal was not signed as the replacement Kuznetsov NK-321 engines from a Tupolev Tu-160 bomber were military hardware and the Russian government would not allow them to be exported.

In 2003, after the retirement of Concorde, there was renewed interest from several wealthy individuals who wanted to use the Tu-144LL for a transatlantic record attempt, despite the high cost of a flight readiness overhaul even if military authorities would authorize the use of NK-321 engines outside Russian Federation airspace.

The last two aircraft remain in Gromov Flight Research Institute in Zhukovsky, Nos. 77114 (the Tu-144LL) and 77115. In March 2006, it was reported that both aircraft would be preserved, with one erected on a pedestal near Zhukovsky City Council or above the Gromov Flight Research Institute entrance from Tupolev avenue.

Reasons for failure and cancellation

Early flights

Early flights in scheduled service indicated the Tu-144S was extremely unreliable. During 102 flights and 181 hours of freight and passenger flight time, the Tu-144S suffered more than 226 failures, 80 of them in flight. (The list was included in the Tu-144 service record provided by the USSR to British Aircraft Corporation-Aérospatiale in late 1978, when requesting Western technological aid with the Tu-144, and probably incomplete.) Eighty of these failures were serious enough to cancel or delay the flight.

After the inaugural flight, two subsequent flights, during the next two weeks, were cancelled and the third flight rescheduled. The official reason given by Aeroflot for cancellation was bad weather at Alma-Ata; however when the journalist called the Aeroflot office in Alma-Ata about local weather, the office said that the weather there was perfect and one aircraft had already arrived that morning. Failures included decompression of the cabin in flight on 27 December 1977, and engine-exhaust duct overheating causing the flight to be aborted and returned to the takeoff airport on 14 March 1978.

Aleksey Tupolev, Tu-144 chief designer, and two USSR vice-ministers (of aviation industry and of civil aviation) had to be personally present at Domodedovo airport before each scheduled Tu-144 departure to review the condition of the aircraft and make a joint decision on whether it could be released into flight. Subsequently, flight cancellations became less common, as several Tu-144s were docked at Moscow's Domodedovo International Airport.

Tu-144 pilot Aleksandr Larin remembers a troublesome flight around 25 January 1978. The flight with passengers suffered the failure of 22 to 24 onboard systems. Seven to eight systems failed before takeoff, but given the large number of foreign TV and radio journalists and also other foreign notables aboard the flight, it was decided to proceed with the flight to avoid the embarrassment of cancellation.

After takeoff, failures continued to multiply. Due to expected political fallout, Soviet leader Leonid Brezhnev was personally notified of what was going on in the air.

With the accumulated failures, an alarm siren went off immediately after takeoff, with sound and volume similar to that of a civil defence warning. The crew could not figure a way to switch it off so the siren stayed on throughout the remaining 75 minutes of the flight. Eventually, the captain ordered the navigator to borrow a pillow from the passengers and stuff it inside the siren's horn. After all the suspense, all landing gear extended and the aircraft landed.

A subsequent flight of Tu-144 on around 30 May 1978, not long before the type was withdrawn from passenger service, involved valve failure on one of the fuel tanks.

Limited routes
Only one commercial route, Moscow to Alma-Ata (present-day Almaty), was ever used and flights were limited to one a week, despite there being eight Tu-144S certified aircraft available and a number of other routes suitable for supersonic flights, suggesting that the Soviet decision-makers had little confidence in the Tu-144 when passenger service began in 1977. Considering the high rate of technical failures, their reasoning was sound. Bookings were limited to 70–80 passengers or fewer for each flight, falling well below both the Tu-144's seating capacity and the demand for seats. On its 55 scheduled flights, Tu-144s transported 3,194 passengers, an average of 58 passengers per flight. With officials acutely aware of the aircraft's poor reliability and fearful of possible crashes, Soviet decision-makers deliberately limited flight frequency to the minimum allowing them to claim regular service, and also limited passenger load to minimize the impact and political fallout of a possible crash.

Airframe test failures
A serious problem was discovered when two Tu-144S airframes suffered structural failures during laboratory testing just prior to the Tu-144 entering passenger service. Details are included in a chapter in Fridlyander's memoirs and mentioned by Bliznyuk et al. The problem, discovered in 1976, may have been known prior to this testing; a large crack was discovered in the airframe of the prototype Tu-144 (aircraft 68001) during a stopover in Warsaw following its appearance at the 1971 Paris Air Show.

While at the time, this approach was heralded as an advanced feature of the design, it turned out that large whole-moulded and machined parts contained defects in the alloy's structure that caused cracking at stress levels below that which the part was expected to withstand. Once a crack started to develop, it spread quickly over many metres, with no crack-arresting design feature to stop it. In 1976, during repeat-load and static testing at TsAGI (Russia's Central Aerohydrodynamic Institute), a Tu-144S airframe cracked at 70% of expected flight stress with cracks running many metres in both directions from their origin.

Later the same year, a test airframe was subjected to a test simulating the temperatures and pressures occurring during a flight. Contraction and expansion happened because of the cooling during ascent and descent, heating during supersonic acceleration and cruise and because of the pressure change from high altitude (low outside pressure causing the airframe to expand) to ground-level pressure (causing it to contract). The airframe cracked in a similar way to that of the TsAGI load testing.

While fatigue cracks of an acceptable length are normal in aircraft, they are usually found during routine inspections or stopped at a crack-arresting feature. Aircraft fly with acceptable cracks until they are repaired. The Tu-144 design was the opposite of standard practice, allowing a higher incidence of defects in the alloy structure, leading to crack formation and propagation many metres in length.

Decision to go back to passenger service

The Soviet leadership made a political decision to enter the Tu-144 into passenger service in November 1977, despite receiving testing reports indicating that the Tu-144 airframe was unsafe and not airworthy for regular service. Aeroflot appears to have thought so little of the aircraft that it did not mention it in its five-year plan for 1976-1980. However, it was not the airline executives' decision and Aeroflot reluctantly put the Tu-144 into passenger service on 1 November 1977.

Though the decision to cancel the Tu-144S passenger service came a few days after the Tu-144D crashed during the test flight on 23 May 1978, this crash was regarded as the last straw over mounting concerns about the reliability of the Tu-144. Even the fact that the technical reason for the crash was specific to the Tu-144D fuel pump system and did not apply to the Tu-144S did not help. The decision to pull the Tu-144S out of passenger service after merely 55 flights is thus more likely to be attributable to high incidence of failures during and before the scheduled flights.

Cabin noise
A problem for passengers was the very high noise level inside the cabin, measuring at least 90–95 dB on average. The noise came from the engines; unlike Concorde, it could only sustain supersonic speeds using afterburners, like military aircraft. In addition, the unique active heat insulation system used for the air conditioning, which used the flow of spent cabin air, was described as excessively noisy. Passengers seated next to each other could have a conversation only with difficulty, and those seated two seats apart could not hear each other even when screaming and had to pass hand-written notes instead. Noise in the back of the aircraft was unbearable. Aleksey Tupolev acknowledged the problem to foreign passengers and promised to fix it, but never had the means to do so.

Seeking outside aid
There were unprecedented Soviet requests for Western technological aid with the development of the Tu-144. The request was made despite obviously not helping to foster Soviet technological prestige, which was one of the key purposes of the Tu-144 programme. In 1977, the USSR approached Lucas Industries, a designer of the engine control system for Concorde, requesting help with the design of the electronic management system of the Tu-144 engines, and also asked BAC-Aérospatiale for assistance in improving the Tu-144 air intakes. (The design of air intakes' variable geometry and their control system was one of the most intricate features of Concorde, contributing to its fuel efficiency. Over half of the wind-tunnel time during Concorde development was spent on the design of air intakes and their control system.) In late 1978, the USSR requested a wide range of Concorde technologies, evidently reflecting the broad spectrum of unresolved Tu-144 technical issues. The list included de-icing equipment for the leading edge of the air intakes, fuel-system pipes and devices to improve durability of these pipes, drain valves for fuel tanks, fireproof paints, navigation and piloting equipment, systems and techniques for acoustical loading of airframe and controls (to test against acoustic fatigue caused by high jet-noise environment), ways to reinforce the airframe to withstand damage, firefighting equipment, including warning devices and lightning protection, emergency power supply, and landing gear spray guards (a.k.a. water deflectors or "mud flaps" that increase engine efficiency when taking off from wet airstrips). These requests were denied after the British government vetoed them on the ground that the same technologies, if transferred, could be also employed in Soviet bombers. Soviet approaches were also reported in British mainstream press of the time, such as The Times.

Compressor disc and other failures
On 31 August 1980, Tu-144D (77113) suffered an uncontained compressor disc failure in supersonic flight which damaged part of the airframe structure and systems. The crew was able to perform an emergency landing at Engels-2 strategic bomber base. On 12 November 1981, a Tu-144D's RD-36-51 engine was destroyed during bench tests, leading to a temporary suspension of all Tu-144D flights. One of the Tu-144Ds (77114, a.k.a. aircraft 101) suffered a crack across the bottom panel of its wing.

Economic inefficiency
Finally, the higher oil prices of the 1970s were starting to catch up with the Soviet Union. Much later than in the West, but since the late 1970s, commercial efficiency was starting to become a factor in aviation development decision-making even in the USSR. The Tu-144 disappeared from Aeroflot published prospects, replaced by the Ilyushin Il-86, a jumbo jet that was to become the Soviet flagship airliner.

In the late 1970s, Soviet insiders were intensely hopeful in conversations with Western counterparts of reintroducing Tu-144 passenger service for the 1980 Moscow Olympic games, even perhaps for flights to Western Europe, given the aircraft's high visibility, but apparently the technical condition of the aircraft weighed against such re-introduction even for token flights.

As discussed in Howard Moon's book Soviet SST (1989), economic efficiency alone would not have doomed the Tu-144 altogether; continuation of token flights for reasons of political prestige would have been possible, if only the aircraft itself would have allowed for it, but it did not. The Tu-144 was to a large extent intended to be and trumpeted as a symbol of Soviet technological prestige and superiority.

Cessation of Tu-144D production
The decision to cease Tu-144D production was issued on 7 January 1982, followed by a USSR government decree dated 1 July 1983 to cease the whole Tu-144 programme and to use produced Tu-144 aircraft as flying laboratories.

In retrospect, it is apparent that the Tu-144 suffered from a rush in the design process to the detriment of thoroughness and quality, and this rush to get airborne exacted a heavy penalty later. The rush is apparent even in outward timing: the 1963 government decree launching the Tu-144 programme defined that the Tu-144 should fly in 1968; it first flew on the last day of 1968 (31 December) to fulfill government goals set five years earlier. (By the way of comparison, Concorde's first flight was originally scheduled for February 1968, but was pushed back several times until March 1969 in order to iron out problems and test components more thoroughly). Unlike Concorde development, the Tu-144 project was also strongly driven by ideologically and politically motivated haste of Soviet self-imposed racing against Concorde; Aleksei Poukhov, one of Tupolev's designers, reminiscences: "For the Soviet Union to allow the West to get ahead and leave it behind at that time was quite unthinkable. We not only had to prevent the West from getting ahead, but had to compete and leapfrog them, if necessary. This was the task Khrushchev set us... We knew that when Concorde's maiden flight had been set for February or March, 1969, we would have to get our aircraft up and flying by the end of 1968."

The introduction of the Tu-144 into passenger service was timed to the 60th anniversary of the Communist revolution, as was duly noted in Soviet officials' speeches delivered at the airport before the inaugural flight – whether the aircraft was actually ready for passenger service was deemed of secondary importance. Even the outward details of the inaugural Tu-144 flight betrayed the haste of its introduction into service: several ceiling panels were ajar, service trays stuck, window shades dropped without being pulled, reading lights did not work, not all toilets worked and a broken ramp delayed departure half an hour. On arrival to Alma-Ata, the Tu-144 was towed back and forth for 25 minutes before it could be aligned with the exit ramp. Equally telling is the number of hours spent on flight testing. Whereas Concorde had been subjected to 5,000 hours of testing by the time it was certified for passenger flight, making it the most tested aircraft ever, total flight testing time of the Tu-144 by the time of its introduction into passenger service was fewer than 800 hours. Flight testing time logged on the prototype (68001) was 180 hours; flight testing time for the Tu-144S until the completion of state acceptance tests was 408 hours; service tests until the commencement of passenger service were 96 hours of flight time; altogether totalling 684 hours. It is unclear why the Minister of Aviation Industry and the Minister of Civil Aviation did not endorse the protocols of state acceptance tests for four months after the tests completion. One reason could be the change of the guard – Minister Dementiev, who was one of the chief backers of Tu-144, died a day before the tests completed – but it might also have something to do with aircraft reliability record uncovered during the tests that was no better than the subsequent dismal service record.

External factors contributing to project cancellation
Fridlyander points out that in addition to the Tu-144, Tupolev's bureau had to work on other projects, including the Tu-154 passenger aircraft and the Tu-22M bomber. Despite large and high-priority resource investment in the Tu-144 development programme and the fact that a large part of the whole Soviet R&D infrastructure was subordinated to the Tu-144 project, parallel project development overwhelmed the bureau causing it to lose focus and make design errors. (Design errors affected not only the Tu-144, but the Tu-154 as well). The first batch of 120 Tu-154s suffered from wing destruction due to excessive structural load and had to be withdrawn.

The rushed introduction to service of poorly tested aircraft happened previously with another Tupolev project that had high political visibility and prestige: the Tu-104 passenger jet-liner was the first successful Soviet passenger jet in service. In a decision-making similar to the Tu-144-story, the Soviet government introduced the Tu-104 into passenger service before satisfactory stability and controllability had been achieved. During high-altitude and high-speed flight the aircraft was prone to longitudinal instability, and also at high altitudes, it had a narrow range of angle of attack separating the aircraft from stalls known as coffin corner. These problems created the preconditions for spin dives, that happened twice before the Tu-104 was eventually properly tested and the problem was resolved.

This politically motivated rush, along with the fact that the project was essentially ideologically motivated rather than driven by intrinsic needs of the Soviet society, and with general technological insufficiencies of Soviet industrial base, contributed to the final undoing of the Tu-144 project. (Alexander Poukhov, one of the Tu-144 design engineers who subsequently rose to be one of the bureau's senior designers, estimated in 1998 that the Tu-144 project was 10–15 years beyond the USSR's capabilities at that time).

Moon suggests that subordination of available Soviet R&D resource allocation to the Tu-144 programme significantly slowed down the development of other Soviet aircraft projects, such as the Il-86 wide-body jet, and stagnated Soviet aviation development for almost a decade.

After project cancellation
After ceasing the Tu-144 programme, Tu-144D No. 77114 (aircraft 101 or 08-2) carried out test flights between the 13–20 July 1983 to establish 13 world records registered with the Fédération Aéronautique Internationale (FAI).

It is unclear why Tu-144D's maximum achievable altitude would be lower than Concorde's even regular flight altitude, given that Tupolev's data claim better lift-to-drag ratio for the Tu-144 (over 8.0 for Tu-144D vs Concorde's 7.3–7.7 at Mach 2.x) and the thrust of the Tu-144D's RD-36-51 engines is higher than Concorde's Olympus 593 engines.

Concorde was originally designed for cruising speeds up to Mach 2.2, but its regular service speed was limited to Mach 2.02 to reduce fuel consumption, extend airframe life and provide a higher safety margin. One of Tupolev's web site pages states that "TU-144 and TU-160 aircraft operation has demonstrated expediency of limitation of cruise supersonic speed of M=2.0 to provide structure service life and to limit cruising altitude".

Materials
The aircraft was designed for a 30,000-hour service life over 15 years. Airframe heating and the high temperature properties of the primary structural materials, which were aluminium alloys, set the maximum speed at Mach 2.2. 15% by weight was titanium and 23% non-metallic materials. Titanium or stainless steel were used for the leading edges, elevons, rudder and the rear fuselage engine-exhaust heat shield.

Tu-144DA
A project study, assigned the number Tu-144DA, increased the wing area and the take-off weight, and replaced the engines with the RD-36-61 which had 5% more thrust. The Tu-144DA increased fuel capacity from 98,000 kg to 125,000 kg with a higher maximum certified take-off weight (MCTOW) of 235,000 kg. and range up to 7,500 km.

Variants
 Tu-144 – (izdeliye 044 – article 044) The sole prototype Tu-144 aircraft
 Tu-144S – (izdeliye 004 – article 004) Six redesigned production aircraft powered by Kuznetsov NK-144A engines in widely spaced nacelles, and redesigned undercarriage
 Tu-144D – (izdeliye 004D – article 004D)(D-Dahl'neye – long-range) Production Tu-144 aircraft powered by Koliesov RD36-51 non-afterburning engines. One aircraft converted from Tu-144 СССР-77105(c/n10031) and five production aircraft (СССР-77111 [c/n10062] to СССР-77115 [c/n 10091]) plus one (СССР-77116) uncompleted
 Tu-144DA – Projected improved version of the Tu-144D with greater fuel capacity and therefore longer range increased up to 
 Tu-144LL – One Tu-144D aircraft (СССР-77114 [c/n10082]) converted to a flying laboratory with four Kuznetsov NK-321 afterburning turbofan engines and re-registered RA-77114. The first flight took place on 29 November 1996 with the 27th and last flight on 14 April 1999

Proposed military versions
Early configurations of the Tu-144 were based on the unbuilt Tupolev Tu-135 bomber, retaining the latter aircraft's canard layout, wings and nacelles. Deriving from the Tu-135 bomber, early Tupolev's design for supersonic passenger airplane was code-named Tu-135P before acquiring the Tu-144 project code.

Over the course of the Tu-144 project, the Tupolev bureau created designs of a number of military versions of Tu-144 but none were ever built. In the early 1970s, Tupolev was developing the Tu-144R intended to carry and air-launch up to three solid-fueled ICBMs. The launch was to be performed from within Soviet air space, with the aircraft accelerating to its maximum speed before releasing the missiles. The original design was based on the Tu-144S, but later changed to be derived from the Tu-144D. Another version of the design was to carry air-launched long-range cruise missiles similar to the Kh-55. The study of this version envisioned the use of liquid hydrogen for the afterburners.

In the late 1970s, Tupolev contemplated the development of a long-range heavy interceptor (DP-2) based on the Tu-144D also able to escort bombers on long-range missions. Later this project evolved into an aircraft for electronic countermeasures (ECM) to suppress enemy radars and facilitate bomber's penetration through enemy air defenses (Tu-144PP). In the early 1980s this functionality was supplanted with theatre and strategic reconnaissance (Tu-144PR).

The dimmer civil prospects for Tu-144 were becoming apparent the more Tupolev tried to "sell" the aircraft to the military. One of the last attempts to sell a military version of the Tu-144 was the Tu-144MR, a project for a long-range reconnaissance aircraft for the Soviet Navy intended to provide targeting information to the Navy's ships and submarines on sea and oceanic theaters of operations. Another proposed navy version was to have a strike capability (two Kh-45 air-to-surface cruise missiles), along with a reconnaissance function. The Tu-144MR was also to have served as a carrier aircraft for the Tupolev Voron reconnaissance drone, designed to compete with the Lockheed D-21 and influenced by it, but the project never materialised.

The military was unreceptive to Tupolev's approaches. Vasily Reshetnikov, the commander of Soviet strategic aviation and subsequently, a vice-commander of the Soviet Air Force, remembers how, in 1972, he was dismayed by Tupolev's attempts to offer for military use the aircraft that "fell short of its performance target, was beset by reliability problems, fuel-thirsty and difficult to operate".

Reshetnikov goes on to remember:
The development and construction of the supersonic airliner, the future Tu-144, was included in the five-year plan and was under the auspices of the influential D.F. Ustinov (then Soviet minister of defence and confidant of Brezhnev, who represented interests of defence industries lobby in opposition to the military) who regarded this mission as a personal responsibility – not so much to his country and people as to "dear Leonid Il'ych" (Brezhnev) whom he literally worshipped, sometimes to the point of shamelessness... Yet the supersonic passenger jet was apparently not making headway and, to the dismay of its curator, it looked as though Brezhnev might be disappointed. It was then that Dmitry Fedorovich (Ustinov) jumped at someone's idea to foist Aeroflot's "bride in search of a wedding" on the military. After it had been rejected in bomber guise, Ustinov used the Military Industrial Commission (one of the most influential Soviet government bodies) to promote the aircraft to the Strategic Aviation as a reconnaissance or ECM platform, or both. It was clear to me that these aircraft could not possibly work in concert with any bomber or missile carrier formation; likewise I could not imagine them operating solo as "Flying Dutchmen" in a war scenario, therefore I resolutely turned down the offer.

Naval Aviation Commander Aleksandr Alekseyevich Mironenko, followed suit:

Ustinov could not be put off that easily. He managed to persuade the Navy C-in-C (admiral) S.G. Gorshkov who agreed to accept the Tu-144 for Naval Aviation service as a long-range reconnaissance aircraft without consulting anyone on the matter. Mironenko rebelled against this decision, but the commander-in-chief would not hear of heed – the issue is decided, period. On learning of this I was extremely alarmed: if Mironenko had been pressured into taking the Tu-144, this meant I was going to be next. I made a phone call to Aleksandr Alekseyevich, urging him to take radical measures; I needn't have called because even without my urging Mironenko was giving his C-in-C a hard time. Finally Ustinov got wind of the mutiny and summoned Mironenko to his office. They had a long and heated discussion but eventually Mironenko succeeded in proving that Ustinov's ideas were unfounded. That was the last time we heard of Tu-144.Reshetnikov, V. "What was – was" (in Russian: В.В. Решетников, "Что было – то было", М. 2004) online  Retrieved: 31 July 2011.

Operators
 
 Ministry of Aviation Industry
 Aeroflot Soviet Airlines
 
 NASA

Aircraft on display

While several Tu-144s were donated to museums in Moscow Monino, Samara and Ulyanovsk, at least two Tu-144D remained in open storage in Moscow Zhukovsky.

As of June 2010, two aircraft (tail numbers СССР-77114 and СССР-77115) are located outdoors at Gromov Flight Research Institute, Zhukovsky (at coordinates  and ). Previously, they were constantly on display at MAKS Airshows. Tail number 77115 was bought in 2005 by the Heros Club of Zhukovsky and still on display at MAKS as of 2019. In 2019, tail number 77114 was repainted in Aeroflot livery and put on display in front of the Gromov Flight Research institute main gate.

A Tu-144S, registration СССР-77106, is on display at Central Air Force Museum of Russia in Monino. Its maiden flight was on 4 March 1975, the final one on 29 February 1980. The aircraft was used to assess the effectiveness of the air-conditioning systems and to solve some problems on the fuel system. It can be considered the first production aircraft, being the first to be equipped for commercial use and delivered to Aeroflot. The first operational flight was on 26 December 1975 between Moscow and Alma-Ata carrying cargo and mail. This aircraft was the first SST to land on a dirty runway when she was retired to Monino.

The aircraft was constructed in 1975 and was a production model intended for passenger use. However, it was only used during test flights. On 29 March 1976 it made its last flight to Kazan. This aircraft was put on sale on eBay in 2017.

TU-144S, tail number СССР-77108, is on display in the museum of Samara State Aerospace University. It made its maiden flight on 12 December 1975, and its final flight on 27 August 1987. Development works on navigation system were made in this aircraft as well as flight-director approach.

TU-144S, tail number СССР-77110, is on display at the Museum of Civil Aviation in Ulyanovsk. Maiden flight occurred on 14 February 1977, the final Flight on 1 June 1984. This aircraft was the second of the two aircraft used for regular passengers' flights on Moscow – Alma-Ata route. In 1977 it flew to Paris to take part in the XXXII Paris Air Show at Le Bourget Airport. This was the last appearance of a Tu-144 in West Europe.
СССР-77110 was the last aircraft produced of the model Tu-144S, powered with Kuznetsov NK-144A engines.
In the first half of 2008 the cabin was open for visits and between August and September was restored and painted in the original Aeroflot livery.

The only Tu-144 on display outside the former Soviet Union, tail number СССР-77112, was acquired by the Auto & Technikmuseum Sinsheim in Germany, where it was shipped – not flown – in 2001 and where it now stands, in its original Aeroflot livery, on display next to an Air France Concorde. As of 2017, the Technikmuseum Sinsheim remains the only museum in the world where the Tu-144 and Concorde are on display together.

Incidents and accidents

Paris Air Show crash

At the Paris Air Show on 3 June 1973, the development program of the Tu-144 suffered severely when the first Tu-144S production airliner (reg 77102) crashed.

At the end of the officially approved demonstration flight, which was an exact repeat of the previous day's display, instead of landing as expected the aircraft entered a very steep climb before making a violent downwards manoeuvre. As it tried to recover the aircraft broke apart and crashed, destroying 15 houses and killing all six people on board the Tu-144 and eight more on the ground.

Gordon et al. state that the flight crew had departed from the approved flight profile for the display, a serious offense in itself. They were under instructions to outperform the Concorde display by all means. During the unapproved, and therefore unrehearsed manoeuvres, the stability and control augmentation system was not operating normally. If it had been, it would have prevented the loads that caused the port wing to fail.

A popular Soviet theory for the crash was that the Tu-144 tried to avoid a French Mirage chase-plane that was attempting to photograph its canards, which were very advanced for the time, and that the French and Soviet governments colluded with each other to cover up such details. The flight of the Mirage was denied in the original French report of the incident, perhaps because it was engaged in industrial espionage. More recent reports have admitted the existence of the Mirage (and the fact that the Soviet crew was not told about the Mirage's flight), though not its role in the crash. The official press release did state: "though the inquiry established that there was no real risk of collision between the two aircraft, the Soviet pilot was likely to have been surprised."

Another theory relates to deliberate misinformation on the part of the Anglo-French design team. The main point of this theory is that the Anglo-French team knew the Soviet team was planning to steal the design plans of Concorde, and allegedly passed ersatz (substituted) blueprints with a flawed design to the Soviets. The case, it is claimed, contributed to the imprisonment by the Soviets of Greville Wynne in 1963 for spying. Wynne was imprisoned on 11 May 1963 and the development of the Tu-144 was not sanctioned until 16 July 1963.

Yegoryevsk crash

On 23 May 1978, the Tu-144 supersonic passenger jet was to make a test flight before delivery to Aeroflot. At an altitude of 3,000 m, a fire started at the APU located in the port wing. A turn was made to return to the airport and both engines located in the right wing (engines no. 3 and 4) were shut down and the aircraft began to lose altitude. Fire trailed the aircraft and the cockpit filled with smoke. Subsequently, the no. 1 (outer left) engine failed. Six minutes after the fire started, the crew managed to belly-land the aircraft in a field near Yegoryevsk. On impact, the nose cone collapsed under the fuselage, penetrating the compartment in which two flight engineers were seated, killing both. 
It was later determined that, 27 minutes prior to the ignition, a fuel line had ruptured, causing eight tons of fuel to leak into several compartments on the right wing. The fuel readings were judged incorrect by the flight engineers and thus were not reported to the commander. In addition to the two flight engineers killed on impact, six other crewmembers were injured.

Specifications (Tu-144D)

See also

References

Notes

Citations

Bibliography
 Bliznyuk, Valentin et al. Reality of supersonic passenger airplanes (in Russian: Близнюк В., Васильев Л., Вуль В. и др., Правда о сверхзвуковых пассажирских самолетах). Moscow: testpilot.ru, 2000. .
 Calvert, Brian. Flying Concorde: The Full Story. London: Airlife, 2002. .
 Gordon, Yefim. Tupolev Tu-144. Hinckley, Leicestershire, UK: Midland, 2006. .
 Gordon, Yefim and Vladimir, Rigmant. Tupolev Tu-144. Hinckley, Leicestershire, UK: Midland, 2005. .
 
 Gordon Yefim, Tupolev Tu-160 Blackjack: The Russian Answer to the B-1 (Red Star 9). Hinckley, Leicestershire, UK: Midland Publishing, 2003. .
 Kandalov, Andrei and Paul Duffy. Tupolev: The Man and His Aircraft.. Warrendale, Pennsylvania: Society of Automotive Engineers, 1996. .
 Melik-Karamov, Vitaly. "Life and Death of the Tu-144", (in Russian: Виталий Мелик-Карамов, "Жизнь и смерть самолёта Ту-144"). Огонёк (Flame), No. 3, январь (January) 2000.
 Moon, Howard. Soviet SST: The Technopolitics of the Tupolev-144. London: Orion Books, 1989. .
 Wright, Peter and Paul Greengrass. Spycatcher: The Candid Autobiography of a Senior Intelligence Officer. London: Viking, 1987. .
 Wynne, Greville. The Man from Odessa. Dublin: Warnock Books, 1983. .
 Taylor, John W.R. Jane's Pocket Book of Commercial Transport Aircraft New York: Macmillan, 1974. .

External links

 TU-144 SST fan site
 NASA video clip 
 
 

Tu-0144
1960s Soviet airliners
Delta-wing aircraft
Quadjets
Canard aircraft
Supersonic transports
Aircraft first flown in 1968